Deinotherium  is a genus of large extinct elephant-like proboscidean that appeared in the Middle Miocene and survived until the Early Pleistocene. Although superficially resembling modern elephants, they had notably more flexible necks, limbs adapted to a more cursorial lifestyle as well as tusks that curved downwards and back. In addition, their tusks didn't emerge from the maxilla as in elephants but from the mandible. Deinotherium was a widespread genus, ranging from East Africa to the south to Europe and east to the Indian Subcontinent. They were browsing animals with a diet mainly consisting of leaves, and they most likely died out as forested areas were gradually replaced by open grassland during the latter half of the Neogene.

History and naming

Deinotherium has a long history, possibly dating back as early as the 17th century when a French surgeon named Matsorier found the bones of large animals in an area known as the "field of giants" near Lyon. Matsorier is said to have exhibited these bones across France and Germany as the supposed bones of a French monarch, until he was exposed and the bones were handed over to the French National Museum of Natural History. In 1775 researchers recognized the bones as belonging to an animal "similar to a mammoth" and during the late 18th/early 19th century George Cuvier hypothesized that they actually belonged to a large tapir with upwards curving tusks which he named Tapir gigantesque. Another early hypothesis suggested that Deinotherium was a Sirenian that used its tusks to anchor itself to the sea floor while sleeping.

The genus Deinotherium was coined in 1829 by Johann Jakob von Kaup to describe a fossil skull and mandible discovered in Germany. The type specimen, D. giganteum was at the time thought to be an evolutionary link between sloths and mastodonts. Further remains were discovered and named, including many that would later come to be considered part of the genus Prodeinotherium. These additional remains also helped solidify Deinotherium's position within Proboscidea and finds in India described as D. indicum extended the range of the genus outside of Europe.  Fossils of an exceptionally large specimen found in Manzati, Romania between the late 19th and early 20th century were described as D. gigantissimum. In Bulgaria Deinotherium remains have been found from 1897 onward, with one particular fossil of an almost complete animal found in 1965. These remains were officially described in 2006 as D. thraceiensis, making it the most recently named species.

Some authors have on occasion referred to Deinotherium as Dinotherium, following latinization of the first element of the name. Although pronunciation remains unchanged, Deinotherium remains the valid spelling as it was coined first.

Description

Deinotherium was a large bodied proboscidean displaying continued growth between species. The general anatomy of Deinotherium is similar to that of modern elephants with pillar-like limbs, although proportionally longer and more slender than those of other proboscideans. The bones of the toes are longer and less robust than in elephants and the neck likewise differs notably in that it is relatively longer, however still quite short compared to other modern browsers like giraffes.

Two sets of bilophodont and trilophodont teeth were present. The molars and rear premolars were vertical shearing teeth, and suggest that deinotheres became an independent evolutionary branch very early on; the other premolars were used for crushing. The cranium was short, low, and flattened on the top, in contrast to more advanced proboscideans, which have a higher and more domed forehead, with very large, elevated occipital condyles. The nasal opening was retracted and large, indicating a large trunk. The rostrum was long and the rostral fossa broad. The mandibular symphyses (the lower jaw-bone) were very long and curved downward, which, with the backward-curved tusks, is a distinguishing feature of the group.

These tusks are without doubt the most immediately visible feature of Deinotherium. Unlike in modern proboscideans, which possess tusks that grow from the upper incisors, the tusks of Deinotherium grow from the lower incisors, with upper incisors and upper and lower canines missing entirely. The curvature is initially formed by the mandible itself, with the teeth themselves erupting at only the halfway point of the curve. The degree to which the tusks follow the direction predetermined by the mandible varies between specimens, with some tusks following the curve and pointing backwards, forming an almost semicircular shape, while in other specimens the tusks continue down almost vertically. The shape of these tusks has led some researchers to coin the name "hoe tusker" in reference to Deinotherium.

Although the presence of an elephant-like proboscis or trunk in Deinotherium is evident thanks to the size and shape of the external nares, the exact shape and size of this trunk is a matter that's long been debated. Historic depictions commonly portray it as very elephantine with a long trunk and tusks breaking through the skin below an elephantine lower lip. In the early 2000s Markov and colleagues published papers on the facial soft tissue of Deinotherium contesting these ideas, instead suggesting an alternative soft tissue reconstruction. In the first of these publications the authors argue that, due to the origin of these animal's tusks, the lower lip should be situated beneath them as they evolved their classic downturned appearance. They further suggest that, while a trunk would be present, it would likely not resemble that of modern elephants and instead be more robust and muscular, which they reason is evidenced by the lack of a proper insertion surface. Although later research concurs that the trunk or proboscis of Deinotherium was likely notably different from those of modern proboscideans, the idea of a short tapir-like trunk is questioned. In particular, it is pointed out that the tall stature and still relatively short neck of Deinotherium would render it very difficult for the animal to drink without assuming a more complex posture. Thus it is suggested that the trunk must have been at least long enough for the animal to effectively drink.

Species

Throughout the long history of deinotheriid research, 31 species have been described and assigned to the family, many on the basis of poorly sampled material, especially teeth of varying size. The amount of species recognized by authors differs depending on researchers, but the three species most commonly considered valid are listed below.
D. bozasi
Known from East Africa, Deinotherium bozasi was the last known species of Deinotherium, surviving in the Kanjera Formation, Kenya, until the early Pleistocene roughly 1 million years ago. It is characterized by a narrower rostral trough, a smaller but higher nasal aperture, a higher and narrower cranium, and a shorter mandibular symphysis than the other two species. In a 2013 publication Martin Pickford notes that D. bozasi has mandibles anatomically similar to those of D. proavum, however most specimens are smaller than those of the European species. To explain this, two hypothesis are suggested, one that they share a common ancestor and the other that D. bozasi may be an example of Allen's rule, which states that animals at lower latitudes are typically smaller than relatives at higher latitudes.  However Markov and colleagues suggest that the similar mandibular anatomy may be a case of parallel evolution between late European species and D. bozasi in response to aridification and an increased need for effective mastication.
D. giganteum
The type species D. giganteum was found in Europe from the Middle Miocene to Early Pliocene. However, the exact extinction of D. giganteum in Europe is unknown. The last known occurrences in Central and Western Europe appear to be in MN13 (Messinian to Zanclean), while material from Russia might extend the range of the species to MN15 (Ruscinian). Fossils of D. giganteum have also been found on the island of Crete in the upper Miocene Faneroméni Formation, during a time when the island was still connected to the mainland.
D. indicum
The Asian species, D. indicum is distinguished by a more robust dentition as well as p4-m3 intravalley tubercles and found across the Indian subcontinent (India and Pakistan) during the Middle and Late Miocene.  It disappeared from the fossil record about 7 million years ago (Late Miocene). Although it is generally regarded as valid, some researchers argue that it is synonymous with D. proavum and that the later name would take precedence. Pickford, for instance, argues that fossils from Iran create a geographic link between European populations and the Indian specimens, concluding that they may be one single wide ranging species.

One hypothesis opposing this three-species model suggests that, rather than being a single consistent species lasting throughout the Miocene, D. giganteum actually represents multiple chronospecies, with the type species only applying to the intermediate form.

Other species that have been described include:
D. levius (Jourdan, 1861)
D. levius is a European species of Deinotherium recovered from sediments dating to the late Astaracian to Aragonian. While it is considered a synonym of D. giganteum by some researchers, others propose that it is a stratigraphically distinct chronospecies and the earliest of European Deinotherium. In accordance to this hypothesis, D. levius would eventually give rise to D. giganteum by the Vallesian stage of the Miocene, after which the two species continued to coexist until the formers extinction.
D. proavum (Eichwald, 1831)
D. proavum is a large bodied species of Deinotherium that may be a junior synonym of Deinotherium giganteum. Other research meanwhile proposes that it, alongside D. giganteum and D. levius, is part of a single anagenetic lineage of Deinotherium species. For this hypothesis it has been suggested that it evolved from D. giganteum during the late Vallesion to Turolian, with early members of the species still being similar in size to its ancestor before surpassing it later during its range. However, the assignment of specimens to D. proavum is largely based on stratigraphy and size, making the differentiation between species difficult, especially with some research suggesting that the two species continued to coexist.
D. gigantissimus
D. gigantissimus from Romania is typically considered to be a larger specimen belonging either to D. giganteum or D. proavum (depending on how many species are recognized by the respective author). The situation is similar in D. thraceiensis from Bulgaria, another notably large deinothere, described in 2006 but usually lumped into other European species by subsequent publications. The state of Asian species is especially complex, with a multitude of specimens being described from poor remains. These include D. sindiense (Lydekker, 1880), D. orlovii (Sahni and Tripathi, 1957), D. naricum (Pilgrim, 1908), and D. anguistidens (Koch 1845), all of which are generally considered dubious by publications of the 21st century. Only one other species from Africa was described, D. hopwoodi (Osborn, 1936), based on teeth from the Omo Basin in Ethiopia. However his research was published posthumously and was predated by D. bozasi, described two years prior.

Another matter that complicates the amount of Deinotherium species recognized by science is the state of the genus Prodeinotherium. One prevailing theory is that Prodeinotherium is a distinct genus ancestral to the larger Deinotherium species. Other researchers, however, argue that the anatomical differences, the difference in size in particular, are not enough to properly distinguish the two, which would subsequently render species of Prodeinotherium as Deinotherium instead. This would create the combinations D. bavaricum, D. cuvieri (both European), D. hobleyi (Africa), P. pentapotamiae, and possibly D. sinense (Asia).

Deinotherium was a widespread genus, found across vast areas of East Africa, Europe, the Arabian Peninsula and South to East Asia. In Europe fossils are especially common in the southeast, with up to half of known specimens in the region originating in Bulgaria. Especially significant specimens include those found in Ezerovo, Plovdiv Province (type specimen of D. thraceiensis) and near Varna. Romania likewise yielded significant remains, with one notably large specimen being found by Grigoriu Ștefănescu near Mânzați (type specimen of D. gigantissimum). The fossils of the two now invalid species are displayed at the National Museum of Natural History, Bulgaria and the Grigore Antipa National Museum of Natural History respectively. Multiple specimens have also been found in Greece and even on the island of Crete, indicating that the large animal had traveled there over a potential landbridge. Towards the east Deinotherium is known from finds in Russia (Rostov-on-Don), Georgia, and Turkey. The range of Deinotherium furthermore extends over the Middle East, with the holotype of D. indicum being found on the island of Perim (Yemen) in the Red Sea. Fossils are also known from Iran and multiple localities on the Indian Subcontinent such as the Siwalik Hills. The easternmost occurrence of the genus appears to be in the province of Gansu, Northwest China. The western range of Deinotherium spans most of West and Central Europe including Hungary, the Czech Republic (Františkovy Lázně), Austria (Gratkorn Locality), Switzerland (Jura Mountains), France ("Field of Giants"), Portugal, Spain and Germany. Some of the earliest and most significant finds in Germany have been made in the Dinotheriensande (Eppelsheim Formation) of the Mainz Basin, named for their great abundance of deinothere remains. The holotype specimen of Deintherium, described by Kaup in the early 1800s, stems from this part of Europe. Outside of Eurasia Deinotherium is found in East Africa, with specimens known from the Olduvai Gorge in Tanzania, the Omo Basin and Middle Awash of Ethiopia, and multiple localities in Kenya. Deinotherium bozasi remains have been found in the Kenyan Chemoigut Beds around Lake Baringo, as well as the Kubi Algi Formation and Koobi Fora Formation in East Rudolf. An additional tooth is known from Sahabi, Libya and it's possible that both Deinotherium and Prodeinotherium coexisted in the Kenyan Ngorora Formation.

Evolution

The origin of Deinotheres can be found in the Oligocene of Africa with the relatively small bodied Chilgatherium. Initially restricted to Africa, the continued northward movement of the African Plate eventually caused the Proboscidean Datum Event, during which proboscideans diversified and spread into Eurasia, among them the ancestral Prodeinotherium, thought to be the direct predecessor of the larger Deinotherium.  Generally, Deinotherium displays relatively little change in morphology throughout its evolution, but a steady increase in body size from 2 meters shoulder height in Prodeinotherium to up to 4 meters in later Deinotherium species and a mass far exceeding even large African elephants. The reasons for this rapid increase in body size is interpreted to have had multiple factors influencing it. On the one hand, increased size is an effective predator deterrent, especially during the Miocene when carnivorans had reached a great diversity including hyaenodonts, amphicyonids and large cats. Secondly, continued aridification during the Miocene increasingly split up woodlands, with greater distances of open landscape stretching between the food sources of browsers such as Deinotherium. This also accounts for the morphological adaptations seen in the limbs of Deinotherium, better suited for long distance travel. Furthermore, the appearance of Deinotherium coincided with falling temperatures during the middle Miocene. According to Bergmann's rule, these circumstances favor increased body mass for maintaining heat in cold temperatures. Despite the many key adaptations deinotheres developed for effective foraging, the continued aridification that progressed throughout the Miocene eventually led to the extinction of the group, which failed to survive without readily available food sources matching their diet. Populations in Western Europe were the first to disappear, followed later by those in Eastern Europe. While European lineages of Deinotherium had gone extinct with the onset of the Pliocene, the genus managed to survive notably longer in its southern range in Africa. The last known Deinotherium remains, assigned to D. bozasi, were found in sediments dating to the Pleistocene, approximately 1 million years ago.

Paleoecology

Several key adaptations suggest that Deinotherium was a folivorous, browsing proboscidean that preferred open woodland habitats and fed on the leaves of the tree canopy. In Asia D. indicum has been associated with wet and warm, low-energy woodland and in Portugal deinotheriid remains were found in regions corresponding with moist, tropical to subtropical woodland conditions likened to modern Senegal. A browsing lifestyle is supported by the inclination of the occiput that gives Deinotherium a slightly more raised head posture, and their teeth, which strongly resemble those of modern tapirs, animals that predominantly feed on fruits, flowers, bark and leaves. Their limbs show some notable differences to Prodeinotherium, allowing for a more agile mode of locomotion and allowing for easier travel across open landscapes in the search of food, which coincides with the widespread breakup of forests and expansion of grasslands during the time Deinotherium lived in Europe. Fossil finds from the Austrian Gratkorn locality  and the Mainz Basin in Germany indicate that Deinotherium was not a permanent resident in some areas it inhabited. In Austria it has been suggested that they traversed areas on a regular basis, while in Germany there is evidence for the animals range shifting with changing climatic conditions, present during subtropical climate conditions and absent in sub-boreal conditions.

One of the most enigmatic features of Deinotherium are their downturned tusks and their function. Research conducted on Deinotherium suggests that these tusks were likely not used for digging, nor are they sexually dimorphic, leaving use in feeding as their most likely function. These tusks exhibit patterns of wear, in particular on their medial and caudal sides. In a 2001 paper Markov and colleagues argue that Deinotherium could have used its tusks to remove branches that would have gotten in the way of feeding, while using the proboscis to transport leaf material into its mouth. From there Deinotherium would have used a powerful tongue (inferred based on a notable trough at the front of the symphysis) to further manipulate its food. Different tusk anatomy in young individuals would suggest altered feeding strategies in juveniles.

Cultural significance

Possible influence on Greek myths 
Deinotherium is among the fossil proboscideans represented in the Miocene-age deposits on the Greek island of Samos, alongside Konobelodon and Choerolophodon. Adrienne Mayor and Nikos Solounias have speculated that these taxa may have influenced local legends of the island's deep history, serving as inspiration for gigantic mythical monsters called Neades, creatures whose voices were believed to cause earthquakes. Mayor and Solounias base their speculation on the fact that the fossils on Samos are found near a major fault zone, suggesting that ancient Greeks may have interpreted the presence of their skeletal remains as being associated with past seismic activity in the region. Ancient sources attest that the bones of these creatures were put on display and that their stories inspired local expressions such as "They shout louder than the Neades!"

Mayor and Solounias also suggest that these fossils may have inspired another story of the god Dionysus waging war with the Amazons on Samos, drawing similar comparisons between the island's geology and a description by Plutarch of this mythic fight. In this story, their skeletal remains are interpreted as belonging to the victims of this ancient war, who like the Neades were able to rend the earth when they cried out in death. They argue that ancient residents of Samos were aware of both the island's fossil record and its geology, and that these stories were early attempts to make sense of the two.

References

Further reading 

 Carroll, R.L. (1988), Vertebrate Paleontology and Evolution, WH Freeman & Co.
 Colbert, E. H. (1969), Evolution of the Vertebrates, John Wiley & Sons Inc (2nd ed.)
 Harris, J.M. (1976) Evolution of feeding mechanisms in the family Deinotheriidae (Mammalia: Proboscidea). Zool. J. Linn. Soc. 56: 331-362

Deinotheriids
Miocene proboscideans
Pliocene proboscideans
Pleistocene proboscideans
Miocene genus first appearances
Pleistocene genus extinctions
Miocene mammals of Africa
Miocene mammals of Europe
Miocene mammals of Asia
Pliocene mammals of Africa
Pliocene mammals of Europe
Pliocene mammals of Asia
Pleistocene mammals of Asia
Pleistocene mammals of Africa
Pleistocene mammals of Europe
Prehistoric elephants
Prehistoric placental genera
Taxa named by Johann Jakob Kaup
Fossil taxa described in 1829